The Libyan Cup is the main knock-out competition for football clubs in Libya.

History
The Libyan Cup competition started in 1976.
From the year 1978 to the year 1995 the Libyan Cup was played only 3 times, The LPL's runner-up was named (non-officially) as a Libyan Cup winner and played in the African Cup Winners' Cup. 
The name changed in 1996 to Al Fatah Cup

Winners by season

Performance by club

External links
Goalzz Libyan Cup History
RSSSF competition history

    
Libya